Ernest Asante (born 6 November 1988) is a Ghanaian footballer who plays for Cypriot club Doxa Katokopias.

Club career

Early career
Asante played for the Brong Ahafo U12 side in the National Milo Games hosted in Sunyani, B/A while attending middle school at Ridge.

Start
On 23 January 2011, Asante signed a three-year contract with Norwegian Tippeligaen side IK Start after impressing on trial. On 3 April 2011, he made his debut for Start in a 5–1 win against Strømsgodset, coming on as a substitute in the 60th minute and setting up a goal.

Stabæk
On 7 March 2015, Asante signed a three-year contract with league rivals Stabæk Fotball.

FC Nordsjælland
In August 2016 he signed a contract with Danish Superliga club FC Nordsjælland.

Omonia
On 24 August 2020, Asante signed a two-year contract with Cypriot First Division club Omonia. In his first season at the club, Asante helped Omonia win the league championship for the 21st time in club history. In April 2021, he suffered a rupture of the anterior cruciate ligament and meniscus injury, which kept him out of action for the rest of the season, and for a large portion of the following season. His team went on to win that year's Cypriot Cup.

Doxa Katokopias 
On 27 August 2022, Asante joined Cypriot First Division club Doxa Katokopias. In September, he joined AEK Larnaca on a year-long loan.

International career
Asante played in the 2005 FIFA U-17 World Championship, the eleventh edition of the tournament, which was held in the cities of Lima, Trujillo, Chiclayo, Piura and Iquitos in Peru between 16 September and 2 October 2005. Ghana placed third after drawing in all of their three group matches, scoring three and conceding three in the process.

He made his debut for the Ghana national football team on 23 March 2019 in an Africa Cup of Nations qualifier against Kenya, as a 76th-minute substitute for Jordan Ayew.

Career statistics

Honours
Omonia
Cypriot First Division: 2020–21
Cypriot Cup: 2021–22
Cypriot Super Cup: 2021

References

External links
 
 

1988 births
Living people
Ghanaian footballers
Ghana international footballers
K.S.K. Beveren players
IK Start players
Stabæk Fotball players
FC Nordsjælland players
Eliteserien players
Al Jazira Club players
Al-Hazem F.C. players
Fujairah FC players
Norwegian First Division players
UAE Pro League players
Saudi Professional League players
Ghanaian expatriate footballers
Expatriate footballers in Belgium
Ghanaian expatriate sportspeople in Belgium
Expatriate footballers in Norway
Expatriate men's footballers in Denmark
Ghanaian expatriate sportspeople in Norway
Expatriate footballers in the United Arab Emirates
Expatriate footballers in Saudi Arabia
Ghanaian expatriate sportspeople in Saudi Arabia
Association football wingers